St Thomas's Church is a Church of England church in the Diocese of Leeds. It is situated in Huddersfield, West Yorkshire, England and is a Grade II* listed building.  The church was designed by Sir George Gilbert Scott and built between 1857 and 1859. It was consecrated in 1859 and celebrated its 150th anniversary in 2009.

St Thomas's stands in the Modern Catholic tradition of the Church of England. As the parish rejects the ordination of women, it receives alternative episcopal oversight from the Bishop of Wakefield (currently Tony Robinson).

See also
Listed buildings in Huddersfield (Newsome Ward - outer areas)

References

External links

Buildings and structures in Huddersfield
Grade II* listed churches in West Yorkshire
Huddersfield
George Gilbert Scott buildings
Huddersfield, St Thomas
1859 establishments in England
Anglo-Catholic church buildings in West Yorkshire
Anglo-Catholic churches in England receiving AEO